The S5 is a railway service of RER Vaud that provides hourly service between  and  in the Swiss canton of Vaud. Swiss Federal Railways, the national railway company of Switzerland, operates the service.

Operations 
It makes all local stops. It is paired with the S6, providing half-hourly service between the two cities.

History 

With the December 2020 timetable change the eastern terminus was changed from Palézieux to Aigle, replacing the S3, with limited service beyond to Bex and St-Maurice. In December 2021, SBB extended the S5 on weekdays from Aigle to Bex.

The RER Vaud lines were substantially reorganized for the December 2022 timetable change. The "new" S5 was a combination of the former S3 and S6, making local stops on the Simplon line between Allaman and Palézieux.

References

External links 

 2023 timetable: Allaman–Lausanne and Lausanne–Palézieux

RER Vaud lines
Transport in the canton of Vaud